Diaphonia is a genus of beetles belonging to the family Scarabaeidae, subfamily Cetoniinae.

Cetoniinae